Storsteinsfjellet  is a mountain ridge in Narvik Municipality in Nordland county, Norway. The lake Sealggajávri lies immediately north of the mountain and the lake Lossivatnet lies just west of the mountain.

References

Narvik
Mountains of Nordland